The Real Catwalk is a series of fashion shows started in New York and continued around the world. The project was started by America's Next Top Model and plus-size activist Khrystyana Kazakova to recognize body diversity. The first show was in New York City's Time Square in December 2017. The second show was in London's Trafalgar Square on July 14, 2018 and included approximately 115 people walking the runway for body positivity.

For the third show in New York On December 1, 2018 clothing brands offered participants their clothes and lingerie to model including Swimsuits for All, Woman Within, Roaman's and KingSize.  The show was opened by model Jari Jones and included men and women of all backgrounds and sizes.

The event returned to the UK in 2019 and was covered by Glamour UK.

References 

Fashion events in the United States